Mary Young Ridenbaugh (1834 in Shelby County, Kentucky –  1941) was an American biographer and novelist, best remembered for her novels Enola; Or, Her Fatal Mistake (1886), Portrait and Biographical Sketch of J. Harvie Dew, M.D. (1890), and The Biography of Ephraim McDowell: The Father of Ovariotomy (1894). Her novel was the namesake of Enola Gay Tibbets, who in-turn was the namesake of the Enola Gay bomber. She was the granddaughter of Ephraim McDowell and the wife of William Ridenbaugh. She was also known as Mary Thompson Valentine and Mary Thompson Young.

References 

1834 births
1941 deaths
American biographers
American writers
19th-century American novelists
American women novelists
People from Shelby County, Kentucky